Luciano Astudillo (born 1972) is an ordinary member of the Swedish Riksdag. He is a member of the Social Democratic party and represents the City of Malmö. Elected in 2006 he is currently a member of the Labour committee. Prior to 2006 he worked in Deputy Prime Minister's office as a substitute.

References

1972 births
Living people
People from Santiago
Members of the Riksdag 2002–2006
Chilean emigrants to Sweden
Swedish politicians of Chilean descent